Bear Creek is a stream in San Joaquin and Calaveras counties, in the U.S. state of California. It is a tributary of the Mokelumne River.

Bear Creek was named from sightings of the grizzly bear by early settlers.

See also
List of rivers of California

References

Rivers of Calaveras County, California
Rivers of San Joaquin County, California
Rivers of Northern California